Pseudostegania yargongaria is a moth in the family Geometridae. It is found in China.

References

Moths described in 1916
Asthenini
Moths of Asia